The pons (or pons Varolii; "bridge of Varolius") is a part of the brain stem.

Pons or pons may also refer to:

People
Pons (personal name), notable people with Pons as their surname, given name, or singular name

Toponyms
 Pons, Charente-Maritime, a commune in France
 Pons River, a tributary of the Caniapiscau River (watershed of Ungava bay), in Nunavik, Nord-du-Québec, Quebec, Canada
 Pons (crater), a lunar impact crater west of the prominent Rupes Altai scarp

Other uses
 Pons, a junior synonym of the butterfly genus Penaincisalia
 Passive optical network, a telecommunications term
 Polish Lowland Sheepdog, from the Polish Polski Owczarek Nizinny, a type of sheepdog

See also
 PON (disambiguation)
 Ponce (disambiguation)
 Ponciano (disambiguation)
 Pontian (disambiguation)
 Ponza (disambiguation)